The 1990–91 DFB-Pokal was the 48th season of the annual German football cup competition. 64 teams competed in the tournament of six rounds. It began on 4 August 1990 and ended on 22 June 1991. After the semi-finals both had to be replayed after draws in the first games the final went into extra time, too. Eventually Werder Bremen defeated FC Köln 4–3 on penalties to take their second title.

Matches

First round

Second round

Replays

Round of 16

Replay

Quarter-finals

Semi-finals

Replays

Final

References

External links
 Official site of the DFB 
 Kicker.de 

1990-91
1990–91 in German football cups